Justin Davis (born 1988) is an American soccer player.

Justin Davis may also refer to:

Justin Davis (American football), American football player
Justin Davis (21st century), guitarist in the country duo Striking Matches
Justin Davis (21st century), bassist of the punk band Ceremony

See also
Justin Davies (disambiguation)